Zitting is a surname. Notable people with the surname include:

Charles Zitting (1894–1954), American Mormon fundamentalist leader
Olli Zitting (1872–1929), Finnish farmer and politician

See also
 Zetting, in France
 Zitting cisticola, warbler